Bell Telephone Laboratories may refer to:

 Bell Labs - the institution as a whole
 Bell Laboratories at 600 Mountain Avenue, Murray Hill, New Jersey, the largest facility. Site where Bardeen, Brattain, Shockley et al. invented the transistor.
 Bell Laboratories at Crawford Hill, 791 Holmdel-Keyport Rd, Holmdel, New Jersey, where Penzias and Wilson discovered the cosmic microwave background radiation.
 Bell Labs Holmdel Complex at 101 Crawfords Corner Road, Holmdel, New Jersey, now vacant. Site where Karl Jansky invented radio astronomy.
 Original Bell Laboratories Building (Manhattan), 463 West Street in Greenwich Village, New York, New York. On the National Register of Historic Places.

Similar:

 Alexander Graham Bell Laboratory and the Bell Laboratory were alternated names of the Volta Laboratory created by Alexander Graham Bell in Washington, D.C., in 1880.